The 1915 SMU Mustangs football team represented the Southern Methodist University (SMU) as a member of the Texas Intercollegiate Athletic Association (TIAA) during the 1915 college football season. Led by first-year head coach Ray Morrison, the Mustangs compiled an overall record of 2–5.

Schedule

References

SMU
SMU Mustangs football seasons
SMU Mustangs football